was a Japanese samurai of the late Edo period who served as lord of the Kitsuregawa domain (Shimotsuke Province). A direct descendant of the Ashikaga shōguns, Satouji had 5000 koku income and was a Tokugawa retainer, but had the de facto status of a daimyō of 100,000 koku-level income.

External links
Genealogical Information

1857 births
Daimyo
Kazoku
Meiji Restoration
Ashikaga clan
Year of death missing